Elk Rapids High School is a public high school located in Elk Rapids, Michigan. It serves grades 9-12 for the Elk Rapids School District.

Academics
In the 2020 U.S. News & World Report survey of high schools, Elk Rapids ranked 844th nationally and 22nd in Michigan.

Extracurricular activities

Athletics
The Elk Rapids Elks compete in the Lake Michigan Conference. The school colors are orange and black. Michigan High School Athletic Association sanctioned sports offered by Elk Rapids are:

Baseball (boys) 
Basketball (girls and boys) 
Bowling (girls and boys) 
Cross country (girls and boys) 
Football (boys) 
Golf (boys) 
Ice hockey (boys) 
Skiing (girls and boys) 
Boys state champion - 2019*
Girls state champion - 2016**
Soccer (girls and boys) 
Boys state champion - 1997, 1998
Softball (girls)
Tennis (girls and boys) 
Track and field (girls and boys) 
Volleyball (girls) 
Wrestling (boys) 
  *Co-op team with Traverse City St. Francis, Central Lake, and Grand Traverse Academy
  **Co-op team with Traverse City St. Francis

Elk Rapids also competes in equestrian events for both boys and girls with the Michigan Interscholastic Horsemanship Association (MIHA). In 2019, 41 schools competed in their state tournament.

Notable alumni
 Adam Trautman, National Football League (NFL) tight end

References

External links

Public high schools in Michigan
Schools in Antrim County, Michigan